BANCStar is a specialist  computer programming language for financial applications. The language is an internal language for the National Financial Computer Services, Inc (later Broadway & Seymour) BANCStar application, which is software to automate the operations of a bank branch.

The language is a fixed format four integer command language NFCS internally referred to as "Screen Code". It resembles an esoteric programming language; so much so that it has sometimes been mistaken for a joke language. Conceptually the BANCStar application executed "Screen Code" much like a primitive virtual machine. In the 5.1c release the only legal characters are the  numerals 0–9, the comma, the minus sign and the carriage return.  However, it is used in real commercial applications. It was originally intended as generated code from a user interface-building tool — similar to bytecode rendered in ASCII — but due to limitations in the tool, it became a directly programmed language in itself.

The BANCStar 10.0 release changed the "Screen Code" format to binary, and rearranged the numeric codes into an opcode with a variable number of parameter integers. The 10.0 opcode encoded a bit mapped length value that indicated the length of the command in words.

Sample BANCStar 5.1c Screen Code 
8607,,,1
11547,15475,22002,22002
1316,1629,1,1649
3001,1316,3,30078
11528,22052,22002,22002
9301,0,1528,1528
31568,10001,800,107
8560,,,1568
8550,210,,
3001,,,
3100,1316,3,30089
11547,15475,22002,22002
3001,1316,3,30089
3001,1317,3,10000
8400,,,
8550,700,801,
3001,,,
9301,0,522,522
3000,1284,3,10001
8500,,3,
8500,,5,
1547,,1,-2301

References

External links 
 jloughry/BANCStar on GitHub
 BANCStar on esolangs.org - Includes information gathered by reverse engineering and archaeological research.

Domain-specific programming languages